June Night is a 1940 Swedish language drama film directed by Per Lindberg. It stars Ingrid Bergman and Marianne Löfgren.

Plot summary
A woman, involved with a sailor, is shot by him after trying to leave him. She survives, but as a result of this incident the press portray her as a tramp. To escape the press, she moves from her small home town to the big city of Stockholm, where the press eventually catch up with her.

Cast
 Ingrid Bergman ...  Kerstin Nordbäck - aka Sara Nordanå 
 Marianne Löfgren...  Åsa 
 Lill-Tollie Zellman ...  Jane Jacobs 
 Marianne Aminoff ...  Nickan Dahlin 
 Olof Widgren ...  Stefan von Bremen 
 Gunnar Sjöberg ...  Nils Asklund 
 Gabriel Alw ...  Professor Tillberg 
 Olof Winnerstrand ...  Count 
 Sigurd Wallén ...  Editor-in-Chief Johansson-Eldh - aka 'Röken' 
 Hasse Ekman ...  Willy Wilson - Journalist 
 Maritta Marke ...  Miss Vanja - Journalist 
 Gudrun Brost ...  Mrs. Nilsson, telephone operator 
 John Botvid ...  Gurkan 
 Karin Swanström ...  Mrs. Cronsiöö 
 Carl Ström ...  Doctor Berggren

References

External links
 
 
 

Swedish black-and-white films
1940s Swedish-language films
1940 films
1940 drama films
Swedish drama films
Films directed by Per Lindberg
1940s Swedish films